The 2000–01 Macedonian Second Football League was the ninth season since its establishment. It began on 19 August 2000 and ended in May 2001.

Participating teams

League standing

See also
2000–01 Macedonian Football Cup
2000–01 Macedonian First Football League

References

External links
Macedonia - List of final tables (RSSSF)
Football Federation of Macedonia 
MacedonianFootball.com 

Macedonia 2
2
Macedonian Second Football League seasons